The 1922 United States Senate election in Vermont took place on November 7, 1922. Incumbent Republican Carroll S. Page did not run for re-election to another term in the United States Senate. Republican candidate Frank L. Greene defeated Democratic candidate William B. Mayo to succeed him.

Republican primary

Results

Democratic primary

Results

General election

Results

References

1922
Vermont
United States Senate